The Leipzig tramway network is a network of tramways which together with the S-Bahn Mitteldeutschland forms the backbone of the public transport system in Leipzig, a city in the federal state of Saxony, Germany.  Opened in 1872, the network has been operated since 1938 by Leipziger Verkehrsbetriebe (LVB), and is integrated in the Mitteldeutscher Verkehrsverbund (MDV).

History

Rolling stock 
As of 1 January 2020 there were a total of 245 trams and 43 trailers in regular service, consisting of the following:

 84 Tatra T4D-M (Typ 33c/33d/33h/33i)
 56 Low floor articulated trams of type NGT8 (Typ 36/36a)
 49 Low floor articulated trams of type NGTW6  (Typ 37/37a/37b)
 33 Low floor articulated trams of type NGT12-LEI classicXXL (Bombardier Flexity Classic) (Typ 38/38a)
 23 Low floor articulated trams of type NGT10 Solaris Tramino (Typ 39)
 43 Low floor trailers of type  NB4 (Typ 68a/68b)

In 2018 Leipzig sold 20 used trams to the Ukrainian city Dnipro, to be used on its tram routes.

Gallery

See also
List of town tramway systems in Germany
Trams in Germany

References

External links

 
 

Leipzig
Transport in Leipzig
Leipzig